Limite (Portuguese for "limit" or "border") is a film, directed, written and produced by Mário Peixoto, who was inspired by a photograph by André Kertész.  Limite was filmed in 1930 and first screened in 1931. It was restored from 1966 to 1978 from a single damaged nitrate print, and one scene remains missing.

Cited by some as the greatest of all Brazilian films, this 120-minute, silent, and experimental feature by novelist and poet Peixoto, who never completed another film, won the admiration of many, including Sergei Eisenstein, Georges Sadoul, and Walter Salles. In 2015, it was voted number 1 on the Abraccine Top 100 Brazilian films list. It is considered to be a cult film.

Background

In August 1929, Peixoto was in Paris, on a summer break from his studies in England, when he saw a photograph by André Kertész of two handcuffed male hands around the neck of a woman who is gazing at the camera.  This became the 'generative' or 'Protean' image for Limite.  The film's unusual structure has kept the film in the margins of most film histories, where it has been known mainly as a provocative and legendary cult film.

Plot summary
A man and two women are lost at sea in a rowboat. Their pasts are conveyed in flashbacks throughout the film, clearly denoted by changes in music. One woman has escaped from prison; another has left an oppressive and unhappy marriage; the man is in love with someone else's wife.

Cast
 Olga Breno as Woman #1
 Tatiana Rey as Woman #2
 Raul Schnoor as Man #1
 Brutus Pedreira as Man #2
 Carmen Santos as Woman eating a fruit
 Mário Peixoto as Man sitting at the cemetery
 Edgar Brasil as Man asleep in the theater
 Iolanda Bernardes as Woman at the sewing-machine

Production 
Peixoto wanted to play the male lead himself, and pitched the film to Brazilian directors Humberto Mauro and Adhemar Gonzaga, both of whom said that Peixoto's scenario was too personal to be directed by anyone else. Peixoto decided to proceed, and paid for the production using family funds. He filmed in 1930 on the coast of Mangaratiba, a village about 50 miles from Rio de Janeiro, where his cousin owned a farm. Stylistically, Limite follows a number of great 1920s directors.  In his article on the film, critic Fábio Andrade notes the influence of D.W. Griffith, Soviet montage, the German Expressionist works of F.W. Murnau and Robert Wiene, French Surrealist shorts by Germaine Dulac and Man Ray, Robert J. Flaherty, Carl Theodor Dreyer and particularly Jean Epstein, all of which are visible in German-born Edgar Brasil's cinematography.

One scene takes place at a screening of The Adventurer (1917 film) by Charlie Chaplin, suggesting another important influence on Peixoto's film.

Reception 
Limite had three public screenings in Rio de Janeiro between May 1931 and January 1932, receiving little public support or critical acclaim. Its reputation built slowly: Vinicius de Moraes, who later became a prominent Brazilian poet and lyricist, showed the film to Orson Welles when he visited Brazil in 1942 to film parts of It's All True. Other screenings took place in private film societies, alongside works by Sergei Eisenstein and Vsevolod Pudovkin, during the 1940s and early 1950s.

Peixoto died in 1992, aged 83, leaving a substantial body of literary work, unproduced screenplays and scenarios, and a fragment of a planned second feature film, Onde a terra acaba, which never was completed and mostly lost in a fire. 

Peixoto continued to promote Limite throughout his life. In 1965, he publicized an article about the film, supposedly written by Eisenstein, praising its "luminous pain, which unfolds as rhythm, coordinated to images of rare precision and ingenuity." Peixoto was vague about the article's provenance, which lacked primary sources, claiming first that it appeared in Tatler and then an unidentified German magazine and finally admitted that he had written it himself.

Preservation status
By 1959, the single nitrate print of Limite had deteriorated due to poor storage conditions and could no longer be screened, a situation that contributed to its near-mythical status in Brazilian film history. It was stored at the Faculdade Nacional de Filosofia (FNF) until 1966 when the military dictatorship's police force confiscated it, along with works by Eisenstein, Pudovkin and other Soviet directors. Former FNF student Pereira de Mello managed to retrieve the print later that year.  The restoration process then began with photographic reproductions of every single frame, which was completed in 1978. The most recent version,  based on that restoration, was made with the assistance of the Mário Peixoto Archives and Cinemateca Brasileira.  It had its American premiere at the Brooklyn Academy of Music in Brooklyn, New York on 17 November 2010, as part of the World Cinema Foundation's Film Festival. One scene of the film remains missing and was replaced by an intertitle.

In 2017, the Criterion Collection issued Limite on DVD and Blu-Ray, as one of Martin Scorsese's selections for his World Cinema Project.

See also
 List of rediscovered films

References

External links
 
 
 
 Limite at the Internet Archive

1931 drama films
1931 films
Brazilian avant-garde and experimental films
Brazilian black-and-white films
Brazilian drama films
Brazilian silent films
Films set on boats
1930s avant-garde and experimental films
Silent drama films